Clathrina antofagastensis is a species of calcareous sponge from Chile. The species is named after Antofagasta, Chile, where the holotype was discovered.

Description
Specimens are massive, the largest is 20 x 30 x 10 mm. Cormus is composed of large, irregular and tightly anastomosed tubes. Water-collecting tubes are not present. The skeleton is composed of two categories of triactines without organisation:

 Triactine I: regular (equiangular and equiradiate); actines are slightly conical to conical, straight and blunt at the tip.
 Triactine II: regular (equiangular and equiradiate) in most cases, although sagittal spicules are also present. These spicules are very small. Actines are conical, straight and blunt at the tip.

References

World Register of Marine Species entry

Clathrina
Fauna of Chile
Animals described in 2009